San Pablo District may refer to

 Paraguay
 San Pablo District, Paraguay, in San Pedro department
 Peru
 San Pablo District, Bellavista, in Bellavista province, San Martín region
 San Pablo District, Canchis, in Bellavista province, Cusco region
 San Pablo District, Mariscal Ramón Castilla, in Mariscal Ramón Castilla province, Loreto region
 San Pablo District, San Pablo, in San Pablo province, Cajamarca region
 Costa Rica
 San Pablo District, Barva, in Barva Canton, Heredia province
 San Pablo District, León Cortés Castro, in León Cortés Canton, San José province
 San Pablo District, Nandayure, in Nandayure Canton, Guanacaste province
 San Pablo District, San Pablo, Heredia, in San Pablo Canton, Heredia province
 San Pablo District, Turrubares, in Turrubares Canton, San José province

District name disambiguation pages